The Patoka Valley Conference was an athletic conference based in Southwest Indiana. Originally formed as the Dubois County Conference in 1917, the conference changed its name in 1959 as schools from outside the county joined. The conference contained schools from Daviess, Dubois, Pike, Spencer, and Warrick counties at some point in its existence. The conference had eleven members for the 1964-65 season, yet within less than a decade disbanded with four members remaining (and two of those schools closed within another two years).  The consolidation of schools across Indiana was the primary reason for the drop in membership.

Membership

 Played concurrently in PVC and SCC 1959-65.
 Played concurrently in PVC and WCC 1959-65.
 Played concurrently in PCC and PVC 1959-64.

References

Indiana high school athletic conferences
High school sports conferences and leagues in the United States